The New Klang Valley Expressway (NKVE), designated E1, is a controlled-access highway located entirely within the Klang Valley region of Selangor and Kuala Lumpur in Peninsular Malaysia. The expressway begins at the settlement of Bukit Raja near Klang, and ends at Jalan Duta in Kuala Lumpur. The 35-kilometre (22-mile) expressway is one of the most heavily utilised expressways in the Klang Valley region. The expressway shares its designation with the North–South Expressway Northern Route.

History
Plans of the NKVE began in 1985 after the North–South Expressway was constructed and the Federal Highway had become a busing traffic during rush hour between Kuala Lumpur and Klang.

Construction began in 1988, and the first section of the NKVE between Bukit Raja and Damansara opened to traffic on 7 December 1990. The fully completed NKVE spanning between Bukit Raja and Jalan Duta was officially opened by the fourth Malaysian Prime Minister, Tun Dr Mahathir Mohamad at Jalan Duta toll plaza on 11 January 1993.

Developments

Fourth lane addition
In July 2010, the operator, PLUS Expressways Berhad, announced that the government had awarded contracts to build a fourth lane on a stretch from Shah Alam to Jalan Duta. The construction was completed in 2015.

Features

Notable features
It is the second link to Kuala Lumpur from Klang after Federal Highway. It has no rest and service areas but there are many petrol station laybys along the highway. Other features of this highway includes traffic CCTVs and VMS. Many viaducts along this expressway including Penchala, Bukit Lanjan and Segambut viaducts. Persada PLUS is the main headquarters of the PLUS Expressways located at Subang Interchange. The expressways also includes spectacular sceneries of Mont Kiara and Kuala Lumpur skyline.

Restricted routes for heavy vehicles
A restricted route has been implemented on the New Klang Valley Expressway between Shah Alam and Jalan Duta during workdays or peak hours. Heavy vehicles (except buses and tankers) with laden and unladen heavy vehicles weighing 10,000 kg or more are not allowed to enter the expressway between 6:30 am until 9:30 am on Monday to Friday (except public holidays). A compound fine will be issued to heavy vehicles which flout the rule.

Incidents

Rockfall near Bukit Lanjan
On 26 November 2003, a rockfall near the Bukit Lanjan interchange caused the expressway to close for more than six months, causing massive traffic jams to occur in areas surrounding Klang Valley. After clearance of debris and road repairs, the expressway was reopened to public by mid-2004.

Collapsed beam on NKVE–Jalan Meru flyover 
On 10 July 2005, a section of the Setia Alam flyover interchange – which was under construction then – collapsed, resulting in the death of two Bangladeshi workers and injuring seven others.
(Source: New Straits Times 21 July 2005)

Toll rates
NKVE applied closed toll system in their entire route, implemented in all their access points where vehicles are charged according to distance travelled. The rates below is for full length journey between Jalan Duta toll plaza and Bukit Raja toll plaza:

Due to their fare integration with most of North-South Expressway parts and ELITE in a single closed toll system (up to system terminus in Sungai Besi, Jalan Duta, Bukit Raja, Juru and Skudai), the rates would be higher depending on their entry point. Passenger passing through this expressway (between Shah Alam and Bukit Lanjan to ELITE and Northern Route respectively) will have their fare includes distance travelled along this section of NKVE as well in their exit points in other expressways, but they not need to pay any tolls in between.

Notes

References

External links
 PLUS Expressway Berhad
 PLUS
 Malaysian Highway Authority

1993 establishments in Malaysia
Expressways and highways in the Klang Valley
North–South Expressway (Malaysia)
Expressways in Malaysia